Polemon (lived 4th century BC), son of Theramenes, was a Macedonian officer. He was left by Alexander in the command of a fleet of thirty triremes which was destined to guard the mouths of the Nile and the sea-coast of Egypt in 331 BC.

Notes

References 

 "Polemon (3)", William Smith (ed.) Dictionary of Greek and Roman Biography and Mythology. 3. Boston: Little, Brown & Co., 1867.

Ancient Macedonian generals
Generals of Alexander the Great
4th-century BC people